Hitch is a surname. Notable people with the surname include:

Bill Hitch (1886–1965), cricketer
Brian Hitch (1932–2004), British diplomat
Bryan Hitch (born 1966), British comic-book artist
Charles J. Hitch (1910–1995), US Assistant Secretary of Defense and president of the University of California
Frederick Hitch (1856–1913), recipient of the Victoria Cross
Frederick Brook Hitch (1897–1957), British sculptor
Lew Hitch (1929–2012), National Basketball Association player
Nathaniel Hitch (1845–1938), British sculptor; father of Frederick Brook Hitch
Neon Hitch (born 1986), British singer and songwriter